Ostayır (also, Ostair) is a village and municipality in the Yardymli Rayon of Azerbaijan, in the southern part of the country, 220 km southwest of the capital Baku. This village has a population of 1,611.  Population sustains itself by agricultural activities.  

Village is surrounded by forests, hills and small rocky ravines, in 1020 m elevation. The climate in the area is temperate. Average annual temperature in the neighborhood is 12  ° C . The warmest month is August, when the average temperature is 25 ° C, and the coldest is January, with 0 ° C.  Average annual rainfall is 755 millimeters. The wettest month is October, with an average of 123 mm of rainfall , and the driest is July, with 16 mm of rainfall.  

Ostayır is located in close proximity to Azerbaijan - Iran border.

References 

Populated places in Yardimli District